Bước nhảy hoàn vũ 2010 is a reality show produced by Vietnam Television and Cát Tiên Sa Production. The show originates from the BBC series Strictly Come Dancing and is a part of the international Dancing with the Stars franchise. The first season was set to air from April 11 to June 20, 2010 with 8 pairs of celebrities and professional dancers. The first elimination might take place on April 18.

Thanh Bạch and Thanh Vân were announced to host the show. The judging panel will include director Nguyễn Quang Dũng, Lê Hoàng, and the leading Vietnamese dancesport athletes Khánh Thi and Chí Anh.

Ngô Thanh Vân and Tihomir Gavrilove were declared the winners.

Couples

Scoring chart

Red numbers indicate the lowest score for each week
Green numbers indicate the highest score for each week
Underlined numbers indicate the favourite contestant of the week
 indicates the winning couple.
 indicates the runner-up couple.
 indicates the third-place couple.
 The couple finished is in the bottom two
 indicates the couple eliminated that week.

Notes:
Week 1: Ngô Thanh Vân scores the best for her first step (Cha-Cha-Cha) with four 9s; other four notable celebrities who are also praised for a 9 includes Siu Black, Lương Mạnh Hải, Ngô Tiến Đoàn và Quang Vinh.
Week 2: Once again, Thanh Vân & Tisho becomes the best couples of the night with two 10s in spite of the fact that she was previously injured. After receiving criticisms and marks from the judging panel, she suddenly collapses and needs some medical checkup. On the contrary, couples of Minh Béo and of Hoàng Điệp land into the bottom due to weak skills and Hoàng Điệp & Nicky are eliminated. Notable performances: Siu Black & Ivan (they also gains two 10s), Đoan Trang & Evgeni, Quang Vinh & Valeriya.
Week 3: Siu Black & Ngô Thanh Vân get difficulties at the beginning of the week, for Siu Black is her son's accident and for Thanh Vân is her injury from the previous week. At the competition, couple of Đoan Trang and of Ngô Thanh Vân wow the judges by their strong move, enthusiasm, generosity and even sweetness; they each gain two 10s and become the strongests. Quang Vinh's scores the worst, but does not land to the bottom. As the result, couple of Tiến Đoàn & Paige are eliminated although they get the same final score as Mạnh Hải & Anna.
Week 4: This week features Pasodoble and Slow Foxtrot. Most of the couples those perform Pasodoble are praised meanwhile those perform Foxtrot seem ill. The first Pasodoble performance by Siu Black & Ivan explodes the stage with 39 points in total. Lately, Đoan Trang & Evgeni appear with Slow Foxtrot step, completely satisfy all and they gain four perfect 10s. At the end, couple of Anna & Mạnh Hải is eliminated due to the lowest scores by judges and by audience.
Week 5: Prior to the beginning, Ngô Thanh Vân desired to quit due to unsatisfy with the judging, but it did not happen. She is back to the competition and scores well together with Đoan Trang and Siu Black. The bottom consists of Minh Béo & Lili and Quang Vinh & Valeria, then the latter is eliminated because they do not improve much.

Highest and lowest scoring performances 
The best and worst performances in each dance according to the judges' marks are as follows:

Couples' highest and lowest scoring dances

Dance schedule
Week 1: Standard Waltz & Cha-Cha-Cha
Week 2: Quickstep & Rumba
Week 3: Jive & Tango
Week 4: Slow Foxtrot & Paso Doble
Week 5: Viennese Waltz & Samba
Week 6: Two unlearned dances from the previous weeks
Week 7: Two unlearned dances from the previous weeks
Week 8: Favorite dances/Freestyle

Songs

Week 1 
Air date: April 11
Location: Phan Đình Phùng Gymnasium
Styles: Cha Cha Cha & Waltz
Singers: Tiêu Châu Như Quỳnh, Ánh Linh & Hồ Trung Dũng
Special guest(s): Đức Tuấn

Individual judges scores in charts below (given in parentheses) are listed in this order from left to right: Director Lê Hoàng – Khánh Thi- Director Nguyễn Quang Dũng – Chí Anh. The results of the voting is combined with the ranking of the panel of judges, and the celebrities have the higher scores in total are survive.
Performing order

Week 2
Air date: April 18
Location: Phan Đình Phùng Gymnasium
Styles: Quickstep & Rumba
Singers: Tiêu Châu Như Quỳnh, Ánh Linh & Hồ Trung Dũng
Special guest(s): Hà Anh Tuấn

Individual judges scores in charts below (given in parentheses) are listed in this order from left to right: Director Lê Hoàng – Khánh Thi- Director Nguyễn Quang Dũng – Chí Anh. The results of the voting is combined with the ranking of the panel of judges, and the celebrities have the higher scores in total are survive.

Performing order

Week 3
Air date: April 25
Location: Bà Rịa-Vũng Tàu Gymnasium
Styles: Jive & Tango
Singers: Tiêu Châu Như Quỳnh, Ánh Linh & Xuân Phú

Individual judges scores in charts below (given in parentheses) are listed in this order from left to right: Director Lê Hoàng – Khánh Thi- Director Nguyễn Quang Dũng – Chí Anh. The results of the voting is combined with the ranking of the panel of judges, and the celebrities have the higher scores in total are survive.

Performing order

Week 4
Air date: May 9 
Location: Bà Rịa – Vũng Tàu Gymnasium
Styles: Foxtrot & Paso Doble
Singers: Phương Trinh, Hồ Trung Dũng & Ánh Linh
Special guest(s): Nguyễn Ngọc Anh

Individual judges scores in charts below (given in parentheses) are listed in this order from left to right: Director Lê Hoàng – Khánh Thi- Director Nguyễn Quang Dũng – Chí Anh. The results of the voting is combined with the ranking of the panel of judges, and the celebrities have the higher scores in total are survive.

Performing order

Week 5
Air date: May 23
Location: Nguyễn Du Gymnasium
Styles: Samba & Waltz Vienna
Singers: Tiêu Châu Như Quỳnh, Hồ Trung Dũng & Ánh Linh
Special guest(s): Nathan Lee, Hiền Thục

Individual judges scores in charts below (given in parentheses) are listed in this order from left to right: Director Lê Hoàng – Khánh Thi- Director Nguyễn Quang Dũng – Chí Anh. The results of the voting is combined with the ranking of the panel of judges, and the celebrities have the higher scores in total are survive.

Performing order

Week 6
Air date: May 30
Location: Phan Đình Phùng Gymnasium
Styles: Two unlearned dances from the previous weeks
Singers: Thảo Xuân, Hồ Trung Dũng & Ánh Linh
Special guest(s): Lam Trường, Hồng Nhung

Individual judges scores in charts below (given in parentheses) are listed in this order from left to right: Director Lê Hoàng – Khánh Thi- Director Nguyễn Quang Dũng – Chí Anh. The results of the voting is combined with the ranking of the panel of judges, and the celebrities have the higher scores in total are survive.;

Performing order

Week 7
Air date: June 13
Location: Nguyễn Du Gymnasium
Styles: The other two unlearned dances from the previous weeks
Singers: Tiêu Châu Như Quỳnh, Hồ Trung Dũng, Ánh Linh, Khánh Dung & Nguyên Lộc
Special guest(s): Mỹ Lệ

Individual judges scores in charts below (given in parentheses) are listed in this order from left to right: Director Lê Hoàng – Khánh Thi- Director Nguyễn Quang Dũng – Chí Anh. The results of the voting is combined with the ranking of the panel of judges, and the celebrities have the higher scores in total are survive.

Performing order

Week 8
Air date: June 20
Location: Phan Đình Phùng Gymnasium
Styles: Freestyle & Favorite Dance of the Season
Singers: Tiêu Châu Như Quỳnh, Hồ Trung Dũng, Ánh Linh, Khánh Dung & Nguyên Lộc
Special guest(s): Hồ Quỳnh Hương, Đức Tuấn, Phương Thanh

Individual judges scores in charts below (given in parentheses) are listed in this order from left to right: Director Lê Hoàng – Khánh Thi-Director Nguyễn Quang Dũng – Chí Anh. The results of the voting is combined with the ranking of the panel of judges, and the celebrities have the higher scores in total are survive.
Performing order

Dance performed

 Highest scoring dance
 Lowest scoring dance

Guest stars

References

External links
 The Official Site of Dancing with the Stars (VN)

Bước nhảy hoàn vũ
2010s Vietnamese television series
2010 Vietnamese television seasons